Schivereckia doerfleri is a species of plant in the family Brassicaceae, native to North Macedonia, Albania, Bulgaria.

References

 The Plant List entry
 Encyclopedia of Life entry
 Hortipedia entry

Brassicaceae